Baodi District is a district of the municipality of Tianjin, People's Republic of China.

Transport

Rail

Station 
 Baodi
 Baodi South
 Dakoutun
 jingjinxincheng

Railway 
 Tianjin–Jizhou railway
 Beijing–Tangshan intercity railway
 Beijing–Binhai intercity railway
 Tianjin-Chengde Intercity Railway

Roads and Expressways 
The following three expressways of China run in or through Baodi:

 Beijing–Harbin Expressway
 Jinji Expressway
 Tangcheng Expressway
The following two China National Highways pass through Tianjin:
 China National Highway 233
 China National Highway 509

Administrative divisions
There are 8 subdistricts and 16 towns in the district:

Climate

References

Districts of Tianjin